Chogye Byeon clan is one of the Korean clans. Their Bon-gwan is in Hapcheon County, South Gyeongsang Province. According to the research held in 2015, the number of Chogye Byeon clan's member was 76045. The name of Byeon clan came from the fact that ’s descendant who was a sixth son of King Wen in Zhou dynasty was awarded the land named Byeon. Byeon Won who worked as the minister of rites (禮部尚書, Lǐbu Shangshu) during Tang Dynasty period in China was dispatched to Silla having Classic of Filial Piety as one of the Eight Scholars in 743. Then, a descendant of Byeon Won, became Chogye Byeon clan's founder.

See also 
 Korean clan names of foreign origin

References

External links 
 

 
Byeon clans
Korean clan names of Chinese origin